VDO may refer to:

 VDO (company), a German automotive parts producer
 Vertical dimension of occlusion, in dentistry
 Vincent D'Onofrio (born 1959), actor
 Virtual Data Optimization, a feature of Red Hat Enterprise Linux 7.5
 Van Don International Airport, the IATA code VDO

See also
 Video